Top Buzzer is a British sitcom written by Johnny Vaughan and Ed Allen, styled as television's first ever "dope opera". It was shown on MTV in 2004 and later repeated on Five. It revolves around two small-time cannabis dealers, Lee (Stephen Graham) and Sticky (James Lance), and their customers. Sticky fancies himself to be the next Richard Branson, while Lee aspires to be the Kriss Payne of 'Super Pot'.

The show lasted one series, containing ten episodes. It was released on DVD on 24 October 2005.

Guest stars on the show included Johnny Vaughan, Karen David, Ricky Grover, Howard Marks, Mackenzie Crook, Sean Lock, Edith Bowman, Iain Lee, Bez, Shaun Ryder, rapper Kanye West and presenter Xzibit, Tony Hawk and ex So Solid Crew member Asher D.

Episodes

References

External links

2004 British television series debuts
2004 British television series endings
Television series about cannabis
MTV original programming
Television shows about drugs